Brenda M. Saiz is an American lawyer from New Mexico who is a former nominee to be a United States district judge of the United States District Court for the District of New Mexico.

Education 

Saiz earned her Bachelor of Arts and her Juris Doctor from University of New Mexico. While in law school, she served as an Editor of the New Mexico Law Review.

Legal and academic 

Saiz is a director at Rodey, Dickason, Sloan, Akin, & Robb, P.A., in Albuquerque, New Mexico where her practice focuses on trial practice and complex civil litigation, and where she serves as leader of the products and general liability practice group. She is also an adjunct professor at the University of New Mexico School of Law where she teaches civil procedure.

Expired nomination to district court 

On May 28, 2020, President Donald Trump announced his intent to nominate Saiz to serve as a United States district judge for the United States District Court for the District of New Mexico. On June 18, 2020, her nomination was sent to the Senate. President Trump nominated Saiz to the seat vacated by Judge Judith C. Herrera, who took senior status on July 1, 2019. On August 24, 2020, the American Bar Association unanimously rated her as "well-qualified" to be a federal judge, its highest rating. On January 3, 2021, her nomination was returned to the President under Rule XXXI, Paragraph 6 of the United States Senate.

References

Living people
Year of birth missing (living people)
Place of birth missing (living people)
21st-century American lawyers
New Mexico lawyers
University of New Mexico alumni
University of New Mexico faculty
21st-century American women lawyers
American women academics